Coalesse is a United States-based furniture company founded in 2008. It is a division of Steelcase and creates products with the goal of encouraging collaboration. Coalesse is headquartered in Grand Rapids, Michigan with their design headquarters in San Francisco and their main showroom located in the Merchandise Mart in Chicago.

Company overview
Coalesse launched in June 2008 at the NeoCon World's Trade Fair in Chicago. It is a combination of Steelcase's Brayton, Metro, and Vecta brands, but also includes pieces made by Carl Hansen & Son, Walter Knoll AG & Co., Viccarbe, and PP Mobler. Their original brand focus was on designing office and home furniture that appeals to what the company called “live/work lifestyles, but later shifted their focus away from creating home-oriented pieces toward creating more work-oriented pieces.”

In 2012, it was announced that Coalesse was planning to expand their business operations into Europe.

Design studio and designer collaborations
Coalesse has a 4,000 square foot in-house design studio and a team of seven to eight internal designers, with many partners worldwide, such as:
Patricia Urquiola, Hosu chair 
Michael Young, LessThanFive chair
Jean-Marie Massaud, Massaud collection
Scott Wilson, SW_1 collection
Emilia Borgthorsdottir, Sebastopol table
Cory Grosser, CG_1 table collection
Brian Kane, Bindu chair collection
Arik Levy, EMU Pattern collection
Lievore Altherr Molina, sixfivezero_CO collection
Toan Nguyen, Lagunitas lounge and table
Jess Sorel, Denizen collection
Otto Williams, Denizen collection

Projects
Coalesse has worked with companies such as Campbell Ewald, Scape, DirecTV, Grand Valley State University, Tolleson, and Quicken Loans to design some of their office spaces.

Awards and recognition
Some of Coalesse's products have received awards at the NeoCon World's Trade Fair:

Other awards and recognitions
2009 Bronze Award from the Industrial Designers Society of America for their Vecta Akira tables
2009 Good Design Awards from the Chicago Athenaeum: Museum of Architecture and Design for their Andoo and Holy Day lines of chairs and tables
2009 Bronze IDEA Award for their Akira collection of tables
2010 Sustainability Award from Designs With Dignity
2013 Red Dot and Gold iF Design Awards for their Hosu chair
2015 Red Dot award for the Massaud work lounge with ottoman
2017 Gold iF Design Award for the LessThanFive chair

In 2016, Coalesse's LessThanFive Chair was included in an exhibit at Grand Hornu in Belgium that showcased the work of designer Michael Young.

Similar companies
Herman Miller

Knoll

Vitra

Haworth

Izzy+

Nucraft

KI (Krueger International)

Okamura Corporation

Teknion

References

Furniture companies of the United States
Manufacturing companies based in Michigan
Companies based in Grand Rapids, Michigan
Industrial design